This is a list of members of the Western Australian Legislative Assembly between the 1956 election and the 1959 election, together known as the 22nd Parliament.

Notes
 On 17 December 1957, the Labor member for Warren, Ernest Hoar, resigned to take up an appointment as Agent-General for Western Australia in London. Labor candidate Joseph Rowberry won the resulting by-election on 25 January 1958.
 On 11 March 1958, the Labor member for Pilbara, Alec Rodoreda, died. Labor candidate Arthur Bickerton was elected unopposed on 24 April 1958.
 On 29 July 1958, the Country member for Moore, John Ackland, died. Country candidate Edgar Lewis won the resulting by-election on 20 September 1958.

Members of Western Australian parliaments by term